On August 23, 1921, during the Battle of Sakarya, the opposing armies were deployed as follows:

Greek order of battle 
In late July 1921, Greek Army of Asia Minor, under Lt. Gen. Anastasios Papoulas (chief of staff Col. Konstantinos Pallis), comprised:

I Corps (Maj. Gen. Alexandros Kontoulis)
1st Infantry Division (Col. Athanasios Frangou)
4th Infantry Regiment
5th Infantry Regiment
1/38 Evzone Regiment
2nd Infantry Division (Col. Georgios Valettas)
1st Infantry Regiment
7th Infantry Regiment
34th Infantry Regiment
12th Infantry Division (Col. Periklis Kallidopoulos)
14th Infantry Regiment
41st Infantry Regiment
46th Infantry Regiment
Artillery Regiment
II Corps (Prince Andrew of Greece)
5th Infantry Division (Col. Ioannis Trilivas)
33rd Infantry Regiment
43rd Infantry Regiment
44th Infantry Regiment
9th Infantry Division (Col. Kimon Digenis)
25th Infantry Regiment
26th Infantry Regiment
3/40 Evzone Regiment
13th Infantry Division (Col. Andreas Kallinskis-Roïdis)
3rd Infantry Regiment
2nd Infantry Regiment
5/42 Evzone Regiment
Artillery Regiment
Army Reserve Heavy Artillery Regiment
III Corps (Maj. Gen. Georgios Polymenakos)
3rd Infantry Division (Col. Georgios Nikolaidis)
6th Infantry Regiment
12th Infantry Regiment
5/39 Evzone Regiment
7th Infantry Division (Col. Andreas Platis)
22nd Infantry Regiment
23rd Infantry Regiment
37th Infantry Regiment
10th Infantry Division (Col. Petros Soumilas)
27th Infantry Regiment
28th Infantry Regiment
30th Infantry Regiment
Artillery Regiment
16th Infantry Regiment (detached from 11th Division)
Cavalry Brigade (Col. Panagiotis Nikolaidis)
1st Cavalry Regiment
3rd Cavalry Regiment
Southern Group of Divisions (Maj. Gen. Nikolaos Trikoupis)
4th Infantry Division (Col. Dimitrios Dimaras)
8th Infantry Regiment
11th Infantry Regiment
35th Infantry Regiment
11th Infantry Division (Col. Nikolaos Kladas)
17th Infantry Regiment
45th Infantry Regiment
9th Infantry Regiment
49th Infantry Regiment
18th Infantry Regiment
47th Infantry Regiment

Turkish order of Battle
Commander in chief: Mirliva Mustafa Kemal Pasha

Chief of the General Staff: Birinci Ferik Mustafa Fevzi Pasha

Minister of National Defence: Mirliva Refet Pasha

Western Front (Mirliva Ismet Pasha)
Cavalry Brigade
21st Cavalry Regiment
Adatepe Cavalry
Militia Infantry
2nd Cavalry Division (Kaymakam Edhem Servet Bey)
2nd Cavalry Regiment
4th Cavalry Regiment
13th Cavalry Regiment
3rd Cavalry Division (Kaymakam Ibrahim Bey)
27th Cavalry Regiment
28th Cavalry Regiment
Provisional Division (Kaymakam Ahmed Zeki Bey)
35th Infantry Regiment
52nd Infantry Regiment
1st Militia Regiment
2nd Militia Regiment
3rd Caucasian Division (Kaymakam "Dadayli" Halid Bey)
7th Infantry Regiment
8th Infantry Regiment
11th Infantry Regiment
6th Division (Kaymakam Hussein Nazmi Bey)
34th Infantry Regiment
50th Infantry Regiment
51st Infantry Regiment
17th Stormtrooper Branch
18th Stormtrooper Branch
19th Stormtrooper Branch
20th Stormtrooper Branch
57th Division (Kaymakam Hasan Mumtaz Bey)
37th Infantry Regiment
39th Infantry Regiment
176th Infantry Regiment
29th Infantry Regiment
47th Infantry Regiment
48th Infantry Regiment
49th Infantry Regiment
Artillery Regiment
Pioneer Battalion
Provisional Group (Miralay Kâzım "Köprülü" Bey)
1st Cavalry Division (Kaymakam Osman Zati Bey)
10 Cavalry Regiment
11 Cavalry Regiment
14 Cavalry Regiment
1st Division (Kaymakam Abdul Rahman Nafiz Bey)
3rd Infantry Regiment
4th Infantry Regiment
5th Infantry Regiment
17th Division (Miralay Hussein Nureddin Bey)
61st Infantry Regiment
62nd Infantry Regiment
63rd Infantry Regiment
41st Division (Kaymakam Sherif Bey)
12th Infantry Regiment
16th Infantry Regiment
19th Infantry Regiment
XII Group (Miralay "Deli" Halid Bey)
11th Division (Miralay Abdul Rezzak Bey)
170th Infantry Regiment
126th Infantry Regiment
127th Infantry Regiment
IV Group (Miralay Kemaleddin Sami Bey)
5th Caucasian Division (Kaymakam Djemil Djahid Bey)
9th Infantry Regiment
10th Infantry Regiment
13th Infantry Regiment
61st Division (Miralay Mehmed Rushdi Bey)
159th Infantry Regiment
174th Infantry Regiment
190th Infantry Regiment
III Group (Mirliva Yusuf Izzet Pasha)
7th Division (Kaymakam Ahmed Dervish Bey)
2nd Infantry Regiment
23rd Infantry Regiment
41st Infantry Regiment
8th Division (Miralay Kiazim Bey)
131st Infantry Regiment
135th Infantry Regiment
189th Infantry Regiment
15th Division (Miralay Shukri Naili Bey)
38th Infantry Regiment
48th Infantry Regiment
56th Infantry Regiment
II Group (Miralay Selâhaddin Âdil Bey)
4th Division (Miralay Mehmed Sabri Bey)
40th Infantry Regiment
42nd Infantry Regiment
58th Infantry Regiment
5th Division (Kaymakam Kenan Bey)
14th Infantry Regiment
15th Infantry Regiment
24th Infantry Regiment
9th Division (Miralay Sidqi Bey)
25th Infantry Regiment
26th Infantry Regiment
27th Infantry Regiment
I Group (Miralay Izzeddin Bey)
23rd Division (Kaymakam Bıyıklıoğlu Omer Halis Bey)
31st Infantry Regiment
68th Infantry Regiment
69th Infantry Regiment
24th Division (Kaymakam Ahmed Fuad Bey)
30th Infantry Regiment
31st Infantry Regiment
32nd Infantry Regiment
V Group (Cavalry) (Miralay Fahreddin Bey)
14th Cavalry Division (Kaymakam Mehmed Subhi Bey)
3rd Cavalry Regiment
54th Cavalry Regiment
55th Cavalry Regiment
4th Cavalry Division (Kaymakam Arif Bey)
5th Cavalry Regiment
20th Cavalry Regiment

See also
Order of battle for the Battle of Dumlupınar

Footnotes

Bibliography

 Celal Erikan, Komutan Atatürk, Cilt I-II, Üçüncü Basım, Türkiye İş Bankası Kültür Yayınları, İstanbul, 2001, pp. 520–522. 
 Türk İstiklâl Harbi: Sakarya Meydan Muharebesi ve Sonraki Harekât, II nci cilt, 5 nci kısım, 2 nci kitap, Genelkurmay Baskanlığı Harbi Tarihi Dairesi Resmî Yayınları, 1973, pp. 516–517. 

Orders of battle
Military units and formations of the Greco-Turkish War (1919–1922)